The United States established diplomatic relations with Ethiopia in 1903 and commissioned its first ambassador to Ethiopia, Hoffman Philip, in 1908. Relations continued uninterrupted until 1980. In July 1980, the U.S. Ambassador to Ethiopia was recalled at the request of the Ethiopian Government, and the U.S. Embassy in Ethiopia and the Ethiopian Embassy in the United States were headed by chargés d’affaires. After the defeat of the Derg regime in 1991 and installation of a new government, the current chargé was commissioned as the new ambassador. The U.S. has had good relations with the Ethiopian government since that time.

Ambassadors

Notes

See also
Ethiopia–United States relations
Foreign relations of Ethiopia
Ambassadors of the United States

References
United States Department of State: Background Notes on Ethiopia
 2006

External links
 United States Department of State: Chiefs of Mission for Ethiopia
 United States Department of State: Ethiopia
 United States Embassy in Addis Ababa

Ethiopa
 
United States